Rolfs Hall (also known as the Horticulture Sciences Building) is an historic building on the campus of the University of Florida in Gainesville, Florida, United States. It is located in the northeastern section of the campus. It was designed in the Collegiate Gothic style by William Augustus Edwards and completed by Rudolph Weaver, who succeeded him as architect for the Florida Board of Control. 
On September 11, 1986, it was added to the U.S. National Register of Historic Places.  Rolfs Hall is named for Peter Henry Rolfs, who was dean of the College of Agriculture from 1915 to 1920.

See also
University of Florida
Buildings at the University of Florida
Campus Historic District

References

External links
 Alachua County listings at National Register of Historic Places
 Alachua County listings at Florida's Office of Cultural and Historical Programs
 Virtual tour of University of Florida Campus Historic District at Alachua County's Department of Growth Management
 The University of Florida Historic Campus at UF Facilities Planning & Construction
 George A. Smathers Libraries
 UF Builds: The Architecture of the University of Florida
 Rolfs Hall
 Peter Henry Rolfs Collection

National Register of Historic Places in Gainesville, Florida
Buildings at the University of Florida
William Augustus Edwards buildings
Rudolph Weaver buildings
University and college buildings on the National Register of Historic Places in Florida
1927 establishments in Florida
University and college buildings completed in 1927